Miroslav Aleksić (born 6 August 1978) is a Serbian politician. He is a vice-president of the People's Party (Narodna stranka, NS) and a prominent figure in the opposition to Serbian president Aleksandar Vučić.

Aleksić was the mayor of Trstenik from 2012 to 2016 and is currently serving his second term in the National Assembly of Serbia. Prior to the formation of the People's Party, he was at different times a member of the United Regions of Serbia (Ujedinjeni regioni Srbije, URS) and the leader of the People's Movement of Serbia (Narodni pokret Srbije, NPS).

Early life and private career
Aleksić was born in Kruševac, in what was then the Socialist Republic of Serbia in the Socialist Federal Republic of Yugoslavia. He finished elementary and electrical engineering high school in Trstenik and graduated from the higher business school in Belgrade in 2000, specializing in taxes and customs. He received a degree from the Faculty of Economics at the University of Priština in Kosovska Mitrovica (North Mitrovica) in 2010, and in 2014 he completed a master's degree in economics and law from the Faculty of Law for Commerce and Judiciary in Novi Sad.

Aleksič's family has been involved in agricultural production for several decades, and he began working in a family-owned business in the sector in 2000; the company was at one time one of the leading exporters of fresh plums from Serbia. From 2008 to 2015, he was the owner of a company that opened and operated a gas station in Trstenik in partnership with the oil company OMV. He was director of the directorate for the planning and construction company Trstenik from 2008 to 2012.

Politician

Mayor of Trstenik (2012–16)
Aleksić began his political career as a member of the United Regions of Serbia, serving as president of its Trstenik board in the early 2010s. He appeared in the lead position on the party's electoral list for the Trstenik municipal assembly in the 2012 Serbian local elections and was elected when the list won a plurality victory with eighteen out of forty-nine mandates. After the election, the URS formed a local coalition government with the Serbian Progressive Party (Srpska napredna stranka, SNS), New Serbia (Nova Srbija, NS), the Socialist Party of Serbia (Socijalistička partija Srbije, SPS), and the Party of United Pensioners of Serbia (Partija ujedinjenih penzionera Srbije, PUPS). Aleksić was chosen as president of the municipality (i.e., mayor) and served in this role for the next four years. He issued a declaration in 2013 that genetically modified food would not be produced in the municipality, and he opposed nickel mining in the area on the grounds that it would jeopardize several local villages.

Aleksić became a prominent URS spokesperson at the republic level early in his mayoralty. He was given the eleventh position on the party's list in the 2014 Serbian parliamentary election; the list did not cross the electoral threshold to win representation in the assembly. The URS's organization largely became dormant after the election, and Aleksić left the party later in the year to become acting president of a breakaway group originally called the People's Party of Serbia (Narodna stranka Srbije, NSS). The group formally constituted itself as the People's Movement of Serbia in January 2015, and Aleksić was chosen as its leader in February.

The New Democratic Party (Nova demokratska stranka, NDS) joined Trstenik's governing coalition in mid-2014; later in the year, the party was renamed as the Social Democratic Party (Socijaldemokratska stranka, SDS). The Progressives, facing serious local divisions, left the coalition in June 2015.

The People's Movement of Serbia formed a political alliance with SDS in early 2016, and the party formally contested the that year's local elections in Trstenik under the SDS's banner. The NPS/SDS list narrowly lost the election to an alliance headed by the Progressive Party; the Progressives founded a new administration after the election with the Socialists and the Serbian Renewal Movement (Srpski pokret obnove, SPO), and Aleksić's term as mayor came to an end. He served as an opposition member of the local assembly for the term that followed.

Member of the National Assembly (2016–20)
The Social Democratic Party contested the 2016 Serbian parliamentary election on a coalition list with the Liberal Democratic Party (Liberalno demokratska partija, LDP), and the League of Social Democrats of Vojvodina (Liga socijaldemokrata Vojvodine, LSV). Some of the SDS's list positions were reserved for NPS candidates. Aleksić, as the NPS's leader, was given the eighth position and was elected when the list won thirteen mandates; he was the only member of his party to win a mandate. The Progressive Party and its allies won the election, and Aleksić served afterward in opposition. He was chosen as deputy leader of the SDS–NPS parliamentary group, which had five members in total.

During his first term in parliament, Aleksić was a member of the agriculture, forestry, and water management committee; a deputy member of the committees on Kosovo-Metohija and the rights of the child; and a member of the parliamentary friendship groups with Austria, Belarus, China, Croatia, Germany, Italy, Poland, Romania, Russia, Slovenia, Switzerland, and the United States of America.

In October 2017, he permitted the People's Movement of Serbia to be re-registered as the People's Party under Vuk Jeremić's leadership, thereby allowing the party to bypass Serbia's registration process for new parties. Aleksić was chosen as a vice-president of the reconstituted party at its founding convention in the same month.

Boycott and return to the assembly (2019–present)
Along with several other opposition parties, the People's Party began a policy of non-participation with state institutions, including the national assembly, in 2019 and ultimately boycotted the 2020 parliamentary election and the concurrent 2020 local elections. Aleksić was one of the most prominent figures in calling for a total election boycott in all jurisdictions and at all levels of government. He was also vocal in accusing Aleksandar Vučić and Serbia's SNS-led administration of involvement with criminal networks in the country.

Serbia's opposition groups ended their boycott of the electoral process in 2022. Aleksić appeared in the third position on the coalition United for the Victory of Serbia list in the 2022 parliamentary election and was re-elected when the list won thirty-eight seats. The SNS and its allies won the election, and Aleksić now leads the People's Party assembly group in opposition. He is a member of the defence and internal affairs committee; a member of the committee on finance, state budget, and control of public spending; a member of the agriculture, forestry, and water management committee; a member of the committee on administration, budgetary, mandate, and immunity issues; a deputy member of the committee on the economy, regional development, trade, tourism, and energy; and a member of the European Union–Serbia stabilization and association committee.

References

1978 births
Living people
People from Kruševac
People from Trstenik, Serbia
Mayors of places in Serbia
Members of the National Assembly (Serbia)
United Regions of Serbia politicians
People's Movement of Serbia politicians
People's Party (Serbia, 2017) politicians